Chanu is a Meitei ethnic name suffix for women. The term "Chanu" literally means "a girl of a clan" in Meitei language (officially called Manipuri language).
Notable people using this name suffix are:
Bertrand Chanu, French Olympic equestrian 
Irom Chanu Sharmila (born 1972), Indian civil rights activist and poet
Khumukcham Sanjita Chanu (born 1994), Indian weightlifter
Lily Chanu Paonam (born 1988), Indian archer
Ngangbam Soniya Chanu (born 1980), Indian weightlifter
Renu Bala Chanu (born 1986), Indian weightlifter
Saikhom Mirabai Chanu (born 1994), Indian weightlifter 
Sanamacha Chanu (born 1978), Indian weightlifter
Sanggai Chanu (born 1981), Indian field hockey player 
Sushila Chanu (born 1992), Indian field hockey player 
Tingonleima Chanu (born 1976), Indian field hockey player

References